Bougnounou is a department or commune of Ziro Province in southern Burkina Faso. The capital is Bougnounou. The population of the department was 21,209 in 2006.

Towns and villages
Bougnounou 4439	
Bélinayou 107
Bablanayou	74
Zao	1187
Tiamien	245
Yalanayou	253
Tempouré	1045
Suné	595
Sapo	1248
Salo	1404
Sala	2138
Pebiou	652
Nessaguerou	178
Netiao	1170
Laré	762
Keulou	158
Ginsenayou	205
Guelou	650
Dana	1760
Bolo	1211

References

Departments of Burkina Faso
Ziro Province